Chan Chin-wei and Chuang Chia-jung were the defending champions, but chose not to participate.

Yang Zhaoxuan and Zhang Yuxuan won the title, defeating Tian Ran and Zhang Kailin in an all-Chinese final, 7–6(7–4), 6–2.

Seeds

Draw

Draw

References
Main Draw

Suzhou Ladies Open - Doubles
2015 Doubles